Derek George Henry Laud  (born 9 August in Chelsea, London) is a British Banker in the private banking sector with other wide business interests. He has also been an accredited journalist and has written on social, political, travel, and tennis matters, including covering the Wimbledon Championships for more than 15 years. He is the Chairman of the Foundation Board of Lucy Cavendish College at the University of Cambridge, and the first elected male honorary fellow in the history of the college. He also chairs the North American Committee for Cambridge. He is a former Chairman of One Stop Car shop and chairman of the Board of Ravenstone House Group of Schools in the UK, controlled and owned by Pacific Investments PLC.  He is a Fellow of the Royal Society of the Arts. Laud is visiting professor at London South Bank University in the Faculty of Law and Social Sciences. He is a former political lobbyist, with specialist knowledge of the financial services regulatory sector, and was at one time adviser to all five UK financial services regulators, including the Securities and Investments Board (SIB). Later he was appointed to work with the Personal Investment Authority (PIA), where Laud was adviser to the Board, and to Sir Gordon Downey, the Chairman. Sir Gordon is a former government Auditor General and  the first chairman of the Parliamentary Commission for Standards. The PIA later became the Financial Conduct Authority (FCA).  Laud is a partner in the private banking sector. He is also Senior Adviser at Stern & Co, a Rothschild and Goldsmith family related wealth management company. He currently sits on the board of the Overseas Territories and is Executive Director. Laud has been a political adviser, speechwriter and journalist, who is a regular contributor to the Daily Maverick. He also writes for UK news titles, such as the Guardian, Financial Times and Mail on Sunday. He received public attention when he was a contestant on the 2005 series of the British reality television show Big Brother. and was voted one of the most popular ever contestants.

Laud is co-founder and Executive Director of the New City Initiative, a think tank for the finance sector. He is also a partner, partnership secretary, Director of the Advisory Board, and Director of Global Corporate Affairs at wealth management company Stanhope Capital LLP, where Lord Browne of Madingley, the former Group CEO of BP, chairs the Advisory Board, upon which Laud sits. Laud was the first black member of the Conservative Monday Club and first black master of foxhounds in the United Kingdom and is entitled to use the letters MFH after his name, but chooses not to do so.

Early life 
Derek Laud was born on 9 August in Chelsea, London. He was educated at Oxford University and the University of Cambridge.  He played university tennis and captained his team in the annual  Oxford v Cambridge tournament. His degrees include an MA and M.Sc (with Distinction) and he also studied at London University and is currently under taking further research towards a PhD.

Career

Politics
He was asked by David Cameron, Leader of the conservative party, and Francis Maude, the conservative Party Chairman  to be Mayor of London Candidate. He declined and Boris Johnson was then asked. 

Laud was the first special adviser appointed to the House of Lords Rural Economy Group, where members included the Duke of Westminster, the Earl of Radnor, and Lord Vincent. 

Laud was briefly a member of the Conservative Monday Club. In October 1984, he produced a policy paper under the auspices of the club's Immigration and Race Relations Committee titled "The Law, Order and Race Relations". He considered himself on the liberal wing of the club, and resigned following disagreements about apartheid South Africa. He later wrote a paper on how to apply cultural sanctions on the regime and was a vocal critic of the British government for not doing to distance itself from the apartheid government. 

Laud subsequently became a researcher and special adviser, working for Conservative Members of Parliament and government ministers in the mid to late-1980s. He also worked as an advisor to Sir Gordon Downey, the former Auditor General, Parliamentary Commissioner for Standards, and Chairman of the Personal Investment Authority. He was Private Secretary to the Rt. Hon. Lord Rees QC, Chief Secretary to the Treasury and Minister for Trade. He also acted as researcher to Sir Spencer Perceval QC MP, Her Majesty's Government, Solicitor General and worked for Michael Colvin MP.

In the second half of the 1980s, he became an aide and speechwriter for then Prime Minister Margaret Thatcher. During this period, Laud also contributed to speeches for other leading Conservative politicians, including Alan Clark and Michael Heseltine. Laud was a campaign aide for then Prime Minister John Major in 1990 and the 1992 general election campaign.

In the 1997 general election, Laud was selected as the conservative parliamentary candidate for Tottenham, a constituency with a large non-white population that had been represented by black Labour MPs since 1987, but stepped down shortly before the election, citing "business reasons". The Daily Telegraph reported that Laud had withdrawn his candidacy after being convicted for drink driving in the United States. Three people in a car struck by Laud suffered minor physical injuries.

In May 2019 Laud stood for the Liberal Democrats in Witney, for election to West Oxfordshire District Council. as a protest against the WIndrush scandal and was one of the most severe critics of prime minister Theresa May, writing in the Financial Times that she was ‘characterless, incompetent and even her best would never be good enough’. He blamed his long term friend, former prime minister, David Cameron for promoting someone so obviously ‘devoid of interpersonal skills and limited intellectual capacity’.

Laud also works on Human Rights through the vehicle of a charitable foundation and has supported and helped prominent figures fight cases against the police and various other bodies.

Business
In the 1980s, Laud was a consultant for Strategy Network International (SNI), a lobbying company with clients in the mining and minerals sector in Southern Africa and the firm had links to UNITA the Angolan armed opposition group. However, he headed up the financial regulatory arm of the business. He recommended the recruitment of life long friend and business partner Conservative Member of Parliament Michael Colvin as an adviser.  Laud sat on the Advisory Board of Sadlers Wells, chaired by Ian Hay Davison the CEO of Lloyds of London. Other members of the board included, Lady Valerie Solti a close friend of Laud's.

During the late 1990s, Laud was head hunted  into  private equity by the substantial business figure Sir John Beckwith, and was a director of numerous companies owned and controlled by the Pacific Group. The Group had substantial investments in finance and owned River and Mercantile, Thames River Capital,  healthcare, Education (Laud chaired the Board of Ravenstone House Group of Schools), and gyms, media, and a model agency.

In 1992, Laud co-founded the lobbying company Ludgate Laud with Michael Colvin. In 1996 Laud acquired part of Ludgate Laud then with an annual fee income of around £500,000  and with prestigious clients, such as Johnson and Johnson, British Steel and the Institute of Actuaries, the Personal Investment Authority and Takecare PLC . Laud is regarded as one of the early and prominent communications experts in the UK and lectures widely on the subject.

He is a partner, partnership secretary, director of the advisory board, and Director of Corporate Affairs at wealth management company Stanhope Capital LLP.

Laud is also co-founder and the Executive Director of New City Initiative, a think tank concerned with the independent banking sector. He is a banker in the wealth management sector and holds various other directorships.

Writing

In 2015 he published The Problem With Immigrants through political publishing house Biteback and is a regular contributing writer on papers such as the FT, and The Daily Maverick. Since 2010 he has been a regular writer at the Wimbledon Championships and has extensive tennis knowledge and counts Serena and Venus Williams as personal friends. During his first year of covering the Championships he won the media tennis tournament. Laud has recently turned to songwriting. His first song, ‘Over My Shoulder’ with singer Carletheia was released in September 2022 and within two  months had 45,000 downloads on spotify. He is currently writing another book on religion and politics.

Media appearances

Big Brother
In 2005, Laud was a contestant on the sixth series of the British reality television series Big Brother, in which a number of contestants live in an isolated house trying to avoid being evicted by the public. He was the tenth person to be evicted from the Big Brother House after losing in a head-to-head with Eugene Sully.

Other
Laud appeared on a charity edition of the television quiz show Who Wants to Be a Millionaire? on 17 September 2005, partnering Edwina Currie. Laud appeared on the BBC television discussion programme Question Time in November 2005. He makes regular TV and radio broadcasts. He is also a specialist writer on tennis and covers the Wimbledon Championships every year and won the media tennis tournament during the first year of becoming an accredited tennis writer.

Personal life
An enthusiastic fox hunter, Laud was made Master of Foxhounds for the New Forest Hunt in 1999, becoming the first black master of foxhounds in the United Kingdom. He lives between the Cotswold and Knightsbridge in London. 

Laud is an advocate for the gambling addiction charity GamCare and the dog protection charity the Dogs Trust, the latter of which was his chosen charity when he appeared on Who Wants to Be a Millionaire? with former government minister Edwina Currie.

References

External links
Black and Blue: The Personal Blog of Derek Laud
2005 interview with Laud on the BBC television programme The Culture Show

1964 births
Living people
Big Brother (British TV series) contestants
Black British politicians
Black British businesspeople
British lobbyists
Conservative Party (UK) politicians
British LGBT broadcasters
British LGBT businesspeople
English LGBT people
Masters of foxhounds in England
People from Battersea
21st-century LGBT people